Rutana is a commune of Rutana Province in southeastern Burundi. The capital lies at Rutana.

References

Communes of Burundi
Rutana Province